Little Annie Rooney is a short animated film that is part of the Fleischer Studios Screen Songs series. It is based on the popular song Little Annie Rooney and uses it in the soundtrack. The chorus:

 She's my sweetheart, I'm her beau;
 She's my Annie, I'm her Joe,
 Soon we'll marry, never to part,
 Little Annie Rooney is my sweetheart!

Other tunes used in the soundtrack (as instrumentals) include "Yes Sir, That's My Baby" and "Baby's Birthday Party".

Synopsis
The Screen Song starts with the theme of Little Annie Rooney. She returns home to a surprise birthday party. She replies "I'm so Happy", which is similar to Betty Boop's Birthday Party. Annie has a sweetheart, Bimbo, and they both perform the title song. After the cartoon story, the bouncing ball sing-along segment begins. The background image for the first part of the sing-along is a design of shamrocks and smoking pipes, to indicate an Irish theme. In the second segment, the background image is a statuette of Betty Boop. The third segment returns to cartoon animation interacting with the lyrics in the Fleischer Studios style of the time. At the end, Bimbo and Little Annie Rooney are married in a church, then the final part of the chorus is sung by the faces of babies who quickly age to adult men then old men, with the lyrics "Little Annie Rooney, is our grand-ma", an indication that the pop-song which debuted over 40 years earlier was an old standard familiar to generations.

External links
Little Annie Rooney (1931) at IMDB
Little Annie Rooney (1931) at bcdb
Little Annie Rooney at the Archives
Little Annie Rooney at pleasant living

1930 songs
1931 animated films
Fleischer Studios short films
Betty Boop
American black-and-white films
Short films directed by Dave Fleischer
Paramount Pictures short films
1931 short films
1930s English-language films
1930s American animated films
American animated short films
Animated films about dogs